Xbox Entertainment Studios was a short-lived American television and movie studio based in Santa Monica, California created internally by Microsoft Studios in 2012, in order to create "interactive television content" for Xbox Live.

On July 17, 2014, Microsoft confirmed that the studio would be closing. On October 29, 2014, both the vice president and the president of the company departed, and the company was officially closed.

Video content
At time of closure, Xbox Entertainment Studios was developing their first projects: a documentary about the video game crash of 1983, a science-fiction drama titled Humans and a live action television series based on the Halo franchise in collaboration with film producer Steven Spielberg. Future projects were to have included a remake of the BBC sci-fi series Blake's 7, a reboot of the Canadian children's hospital documentary series Little Miracles, and an autobiographical series about rapper Nas. The studio also intended to co-produce certain live events for Xbox Live, including future editions of the Call of Duty Championship, the Miss Teen USA beauty pageant and the VGX.

Before the closure was announced, the studio released a street soccer focused reality series titled Every Street United to coincide with the 2014 FIFA World Cup. Before closing, it released the video game documentary Atari: Game Over and the series spun off from Halo.

In September 2014 The Hollywood Reporter reported that AMC was in talks to acquire the rights to revive Humans and that casting was underway.

Several years after its closure, it was revealed that the studio were developing additional projects before closing, such as an adult animated series based on the Conker franchise.

Content 

Xbox Entertainment Studios offered original films and series that were produced in collaboration between professional studios.

References

External links
Official website

2012 establishments in California
2014 disestablishments in California
American companies established in 2012
Companies based in Santa Monica, California
Defunct companies based in Greater Los Angeles
Entertainment companies based in California
Film production companies of the United States
Former Microsoft subsidiaries
Video game companies disestablished in 2014
Video game companies established in 2012
Defunct video game companies of the United States
Video game development companies
Entertainment Studios